Terry Dave Wright (born January 28, 1997) is an American football wide receiver for the Philadelphia Stars of the United States Football League (USFL). He played college football at Purdue.

Early years
Wright attended White Station High School in Memphis, Tennessee. Wright became a top 25 player in the state of Tennessee.  Purdue coach Jeff Brohm tried to recruit him to the Hilltoppers out of Memphis' High School, but he didn't qualify academically. He instead started his college career with Coffeyville Community College to play college football and track.

College career

Coffeyville Community College
As a true freshman at Coffeyville CC in 2015, Wright played primarily on special teams, becoming the teams leading kick returner with 19 returns for 512 yards.  The following year, Wright made in impact on offense with 50 catches for 805 yards and eight touchdowns, getting the attention of several Division I colleges.

Purdue
Wright elected to transfer to Purdue in January 2017 and joined the track team in April following spring football practice. With football, appeared in 12 games, making three starts.  Wright caught 29 passes for 274 yards on the year.   In Wright's senior year, he posted career highs against Iowa in yards (146) and touchdowns (three).

Professional career

Seattle Seahawks
Wright was signed as an undrafted free agent by the Seattle Seahawks on May 3, 2019. He was waived on August 31, 2019, and was signed to the practice squad the next day. He was released from the practice squad on October 18.

Pittsburgh Steelers
On November 5, 2019, Wright was signed to the Pittsburgh Steelers practice squad. He was released on November 18.

Miami Dolphins
On November 27, 2019, Wright was signed to the Miami Dolphins practice squad. He signed a futures contract with the team on December 31, 2019.

On April 18, 2020, Wright was waived by the Dolphins.

Wright had a tryout with the Las Vegas Raiders on August 23, 2020.

Ottawa Redblacks
Wright signed with the Ottawa Redblacks of the CFL on July 13, 2021, and subsequently placed on the team's suspended list.

San Antonio Brahmas 
On November 17, 2022, Wright was drafted by the San Antonio Brahmas of the XFL.

Philadelphia Stars
On February 9, 2023, Wright signed with the Philadelphia Stars of the United States Football League (USFL).

References

External links
Seattle Seahawks bio
Purdue Biolermakers bio

1997 births
Living people
American football wide receivers
Coffeyville Red Ravens football players
Miami Dolphins players
Ottawa Redblacks players
Philadelphia Stars (2022) players
Pittsburgh Steelers players
Players of American football from Memphis, Tennessee
Purdue Boilermakers football players
Purdue Boilermakers men's track and field athletes
San Antonio Brahmas players
Seattle Seahawks players
Sportspeople from Memphis, Tennessee
Track and field athletes from Tennessee